Poe Township is a municipality located in Ringgold County, Iowa. In 2010 it had a population of 169 inhabitants and a population density of 1.93 people per km2.

Demography 

According to the 2010 census, there were 169 people residing in the municipality of Poe.
 Of the 169 inhabitants, the municipality of Poe was composed by 98.82% White, and 2.37% Hispanic or Latino.

References 

Townships in Iowa
Municipalities in Iowa